The Journal of Early Modern History is a peer-reviewed academic journal focusing on the early modern period. It is the official journal of the University of Minnesota Center for Early Modern History, and is published by Brill since 1997. The editor is Molly A. Warsh of the University of Pittsburgh.

References

External links 
 

History journals
Publications established in 1997
English-language journals
Bimonthly journals
Brill Publishers academic journals